Maryam and Mitil is a 1993 Iranian film written and directed by Fathali Oveisi, starring Afsaneh Bayegan, Hamid Jebeli, Hamideh Kheirabadi, Niyaz Taremi, Parviz Shafi'Zadeh and Mohammad Varshochi.

This film was showing at Iranian cinemas in August 1993.

Plot
Maryam and Mitil is about Maryam who is a six-year-old girl, living in an orphanage who wants to experience life in a family to fill out the emptiness of her life. She has to face a lot of difficulties in order to depend to a great extent on her own determination.

Festivals
 Diploma Honorary for the best child actor (Niyaz Taremi) at the 11th International Film Festival - 1993
 Diploma Honorary for the Best Screenplay (Fathali Oveisi and Jafar Vali) in the 9th Children And Adolescents Film Festival- 1993

References

Iranian children's films